Hvarchil Point (‘Nos Hvarchil’ \'nos hv&r-'chil\) is the ice-covered point forming the southwest extremity of Lecointe Island off the east coast of Brabant Island in the Palmer Archipelago, Antarctica.

The point is named after the settlement of Hvarchil in Western Bulgaria.

Location
British mapping in 1980 and 2008.

Maps
 Antarctic Digital Database (ADD). Scale 1:250000 topographic map of Antarctica. Scientific Committee on Antarctic Research (SCAR). Since 1993, regularly upgraded and updated.
British Antarctic Territory. Scale 1:200000 topographic map. DOS 610 Series, Sheet W 64 62. Directorate of Overseas Surveys, Tolworth, UK, 1980.
Brabant Island to Argentine Islands. Scale 1:250000 topographic map. British Antarctic Survey, 2008.

References
 Bulgarian Antarctic Gazetteer. Antarctic Place-names Commission. (details in Bulgarian, basic data in English)
 Hvarchil Point. SCAR Composite Antarctic Gazetteer

External links
 Hvarchil Point. Copernix satellite image

Headlands of the Palmer Archipelago
Bulgaria and the Antarctic